Pappritz is a German surname. Notable people with the surname include:

 Anna Pappritz (1861–1939), German writer and suffragist
 Erica Pappritz (1893–1972), German civil servant and writer
 Julie Pappritz, the wife of Carl Friedrich Zelter

German-language surnames